The psychological impact of discrimination on health refers to the cognitive pathways through which discrimination impacts mental and physical health in members of marginalized, subordinate, and low-status groups (e.g. racial and sexual minorities). Research on the relation between discrimination and health became a topic of interest in the 1990s, when researchers proposed that persisting racial/ethnic disparities in health outcomes could potentially be explained by racial/ethnic differences in experiences with discrimination. Although the bulk of the research tend to focus on the interactions between interpersonal discrimination and health, researchers studying discrimination and health in the United States have proposed that institutional discrimination and cultural racism also give rise to conditions that contribute to persisting racial and economic health disparities.

A stress and coping framework is often applied to investigate how discrimination influences health outcomes in racial, gender, and sexual minorities, as well as on immigrants and indigenous populations. Findings indicate that experiences of discrimination tend to translate into worse physical and mental health and lead to increased participation in unhealthy behaviors. Evidence of the inverse link between discrimination and health has been consistent across multiple population groups and various cultural and national contexts.

From discrimination to health: two pathways

Stress response 
Research conceptualizes instances of discrimination as situations which are likely to cause stress and have downstream consequences on mental and physical health, as well as health behaviors. In experimental studies, stress in response to discrimination has been measured using a range of both psychological (e.g. perceived stress) and physiological (e.g. cardiovascular reactivity) measures, and evidence indicates that this heightened stress response is associated with poorer mental and physical health and impaired decision-making when it comes to health-related behaviors such as substance use or visits to the emergency department.

Some researchers also argue that everyday experiences with discrimination can cause chronic and cumulative stress that contributes to the “wear and tear” of the body. Instances of discrimination also tend to be ambiguous and unpredictable, which research linking stress and health indicate could be particularly harmful. Evidence from this line of research shows that anticipating discrimination, experiencing stress as a result of hypervigilance and worry, and ruminating over the experience of discrimination can aggravate and prolong the adverse impacts of discrimination on health.

The impact of discrimination-related stress can also be longitudinal, as shown by a study on Black adolescents that found perceived discrimination between age 16-18 to predict stress hormone levels, blood pressure, inflammation, and BMI at age 20.

Health behaviors 
Discrimination also impacts health by inducing negative emotions and lowering self-control, which in turn increases participation in unhealthy behaviors such as smoking, alcohol and substance use, reduced physical activity, and overeating. Research also finds evidence that discrimination lowers participation in preventative care behaviors, such as cancer screening, diabetes management, and condom use, that could help maintain good health. A meta-analysis of 138 studies shows consistent evidence of the relationship between discrimination and health behaviors.

Interpersonal discrimination

Measurement 
Studies assessing the link between interpersonal discrimination and health have been both experimental and observational in nature.  Experiments investigating the link between discrimination and health have manipulated perceptions of discrimination in a number of ways, including exposing participants to racist film clips, asking them to write about their prior experiences with discrimination, and providing them with articles detailing discrimination against their ingroup. Observational studies make use of large datasets such as the National Survey of Black Americans and the New Zealand Health Survey to make deductions about the relationship between discrimination and health.

In most cases, perceived discrimination is measured by asking participants to self-report on the frequency with which they experience discrimination daily (chronic); the number of times that they’ve been the target of severe discrimination (acute); the amount of discrimination experience over their lifetime (lifetime); or whether they had recently experienced discrimination (recent). Several scales have been developed to capture different types of discrimination, with over 90% of scales designed by researchers in the U.S. Racism, for example, is most often measured using the Perceived Racism Scale, the Schedule of Racists Events, the Index of Race Related Stress, and the Racism and Life Experiences Scale.

Across all studies, we find the strongest and most consistent evidence for the negative impact of discrimination on mental health and health-related behaviors, but a meta-analysis of 134 samples also shows evidence of an inverse link between discrimination and physical health. Comparisons between the impact of chronic, lifetime, and recent experiences of discrimination on mental health shows recent discrimination to have a stronger negative impact than lifetime discrimination; differences in impact based on type of discrimination measured were absent for physical health.

Mental health 
A meta-analysis of over 300 articles published between 1983 and 2013 finds evidence of a strong association between discrimination and poor mental health. Specifically, perceived discrimination has been linked to a range of mental health outcomes including depression, anxiety, posttraumatic stress disorder, psychological distress, positive and negative affect, and general well-being. Beyond contributing to distress and well-being, self-reported discrimination has also been linked to DSM-5 (Diagnostic and Statistical Manual of Mental Disorders) psychological disorders such as psychosis, paranoia, and eating disorders. Some studies suggest that the relationship between perceived discrimination and clinical mental illness becomes stronger as perceptions of discrimination and instances of experienced discrimination increases.  In a 2009 meta-analysis, the impacts of discrimination and mental health were found to be a general phenomenon, such that targets of discrimination experience poorer mental health irrespective of their ethnicity or gender. However, a more recent meta-analysis, whose samples were primarily U.S. based, finds evidence of a moderating effect of ethnicity, such that the link between discrimination and mental health appears to be stronger in Asian Americans and Latino Americans, as compared to Black Americans.

Physical health 
Multiple meta-analyses reveal that perceived discrimination is associated with a range of negative physical health outcomes such as heart disease, obesity, hypertension, ambulatory blood pressure, breast cancer, diabetes, and respiratory problems. Perceived discrimination also shows association with indicators of forthcoming health problems, such as increased allostatic load, shorter telomere length, inflammation, cortisol dysregulation, and coronary artery calcification. Some studies indicate that perceived discrimination could contribute to increased cardiovascular risk as a result of experiencing higher systolic and diastolic blood pressure during the day and higher ambulatory blood pressure at night in response to discrimination. Although the association between discrimination and blood pressure has been found in multiple studies, a 2012 analysis of 22 studies by Couto and colleagues only found evidence of this link in 30% of the analyzed studies.

Institutional racism in the United States 
Institutional (or structural) racism refers to the policies and practices embedded in the legal, economic, social, and political systems of society that creates differential access to resources, opportunities, and services based on race. In the U.S., connections between institutional racism and health have been investigated through epidemiological studies that examine the link between institutional racism– in the form of residential segregation and environmental racism– and health-related outcomes.

Residential segregation 
Segregation in the U.S. was made possible through federal policies and government-supported private policies, such as redlining, zoning, and restrictive covenants, which sought to prevent Black-White cohabitation in the same neighborhoods. Despite the fact that residential segregation was made illegal in 1968 through the Fair Housing Act, White Americans still tend to live in separate neighborhoods from people of color, with Black Americans experiencing the highest rate of segregation as compared to Hispanics and Asian Americans. The historical segregation of Black Americans has been identified as a fundamental contributor to persisting Black-White disparities in adverse birth outcomes, health behaviors, and chronic diseases such as asthma, diabetes, and hypertension. Thus the bulk of the research linking structural racism to health tends to focus on identifying the multiple mechanisms through which segregation impact Black American’s health.

Segregation contributes to health disparities by creating physical and social conditions that increase exposure to environmental pollutants, contribute to the prevalence of chronic and acute psychosocial stressors, and make it harder for residents to practice healthy behaviors. For example, Landrine and Corral (2009) identified three potential pathways through which racial segregation contributes to disparities: Black neighborhoods, relative to White neighborhoods, are equipped with inferior healthcare facilities and less competent physicians; exposed to higher levels of pollution and toxins in the environment; and provided greater access to fast foods but lower access to recreational facilities and supermarkets. Other researchers argue that segregation leads to the creation of neighborhoods with high levels of poverty and lower quality education that receive less government support. As such, segregation is a critical determinant of socioeconomic status, which in turn is a strong predictor of health outcomes.

Multiple review papers and meta-analyses reveal that segregation is associated with poorer overall health. More specifically, residents of segregated neighborhoods have been found to be at increased risk for tuberculosis, intentional harm, and later-stage breast and lung cancer diagnosis. Segregation has also been associated with nefarious health consequences for Black women, such as increased risk for obesity, low birth weight, preterm birth, and stillbirths.

Environmental racism 
There is extant research showing that people of color, low-income communities, ethnic minorities, and indigenous populations are more likely to be exposed to pollution, toxins, and chemicals as a result of their proximity to industrial and military activity and consumer practices. For example, research conducted in Warren Country, NC shows that 75% of their hazardous waste landfills are located in Black communities, despite the fact that Black Americans only make up 20% of the county’s population. This pattern is present in most parts of the U.S., such that 40% of the country’s landfills are located in Black communities. A 1987 survey of the country’s landfills shows that 53% of the Hispanic population also lived in communities with one or more uncontrolled toxic-waste sites. Communities of color not only live close to landfills, but they are also more likely than their white counterparts to live near medical waste incinerators, diesel bus depots, and Superfund sites. Research shows that living in proximity with sources of air, water, and soil pollution is associated with asthma, eczema, cancer, chemical poisoning, heart disease, and neurological disorders in Black Americans.

Black communities have also been exposed to lead, DDT, and a handful of other noxious chemicals as a result of the U.S. Environmental Protection Agency’s failure to enforce safety regulations (for examples, see Flint Michigan Water Crisis; Altgeld Gardens Homes; Dickinson County, TN toxic wells; North Birmingham, AL coke plants). Lead contamination is known to be particularly harmful to children and pregnant women as it can lead to anemia, kidney failure, brain damage, fetal death, and premature delivery. A 1984 study by the Illinois Public Health Sector also found that exposure to toxins at the Altgeld Gardens Home led to higher rates of prostate, bladder, and lung cancer, as well as higher rates of child brain tumors, asthma, ringworm, and congenital anomaly.

Impact of discrimination on various social groups

U.S. racial minorities 
Racial minorities in the U.S. include Black Americans, Asian Americans, Latino Americans, and Native Americans. Members belonging to these racial minority groups often face discrimination in daily interactions and situations, such as when applying for a job or getting pulled over by the police. These repeated experiences with discrimination has been shown to lead to heightened stress responses in racial minorities, which translates to poorer mental and physical health, and increased participation in harmful health-behaviors.

Black Americans 
Black Americans report experiencing the most discrimination out of all racial/ethnic groups in the U.S. They also tend to fare worse, compared to other racial/ethnic groups, when it comes to physical illnesses such as heart disease and cancer incidence. Black Americans report experiencing discrimination in a range of situations (e.g. healthcare visits, job applications and interviews, interactions with the police) and through microaggressions and racial slurs. Perceptions of racial discrimination has been linked with psychological distress, hypertension, depression, harmful health behaviors (e.g. alcohol abuse), and a range of chronic illnesses in Black Americans. A meta-analyses of 19 studies published between 2003 and 2013 on the link between perceived discrimination and the health of Black women finds that perceptions of discrimination is associated with preterm birth and low birth weight.

See section on institutional racism in the United States for additional health consequences of discrimination on Black Americans.

Asian Americans 
In a 2007 survey of over 2000 Asian Americans, 56% of the respondents reported experiencing discrimination because of their race, skin color, or nationality. A meta-analysis of 14 studies published between 1980 and 2011 shows that perceptions of discrimination are associated with depressive symptoms, cardiovascular disease, respiratory problems, obesity, and diabetes in Asian Americans. A review of 62 studies also found that Asian Americans who report experiencing discrimination tend to suffer from poor mental and physical health and participate in harmful health behaviors.

Latino Americans 
Latinos living in the U.S. report experiencing discrimination because of their language, accent, skin color, facial feature and appearance. There does not seem to be a meta-analysis of studies investigating the connection between discrimination and health, but a review of 33 studies on the topic reveals that perceived discrimination is associated to poorer mental health and health-related decisions in Latinos residing in the U.S. However, the review did not find evidence of a robust relationship between perceived discrimination and physical health.

Research shows that Latino college students are more likely to be accused of theft, cheating, or breaking the law, which causes them to experience more stress. Perceived racial discrimination in those instances have been associated with poorer mental health, including experiencing psychological distress, suicidal ideations, anxiety, and depression.

Native Americans 
The colonization of the United States constituted systemic efforts to destroy Native American culture and societies, including religious persecution, the implementation of boarding schools that sought to eradicate their languages and customs, and the mass adoption of Native children by non-Native families. These experiences of discrimination, unique to indigenous populations, are thought to be transmitted generationally and influence health outcomes in individuals with Native American ancestry. Thus, perceptions of discrimination in Native Americans tend to be measured in terms of historical trauma, which is the extent to which Indigenous people experience discrimination as a result of the collective history of violence perpetrated against Native Americans during the colonization process. Historical trauma is measured using the Historical Loss Scale, which captures the frequency at which indigenous individuals think about the loss of, for example, their land, language, and culture; and it is usually followed by the Historical Loss Associated Symptoms Scale, which captures how indigenous individuals feel about these losses. Studies examining the relationship between historical trauma and health in Native Americans find that perceptions of discrimination are associated with increased participation in unhealthy behaviors (e.g. alcohol abuse), a range of chronic diseases, PTSD, and psychological distress. Studies investigating the relationship in Indigenous adolescents finds that perceptions of discrimination is associated with early substance use, suicidal ideation, anger, and aggression.

Sexual minorities (LGBTQ+) 
LGBTQ+ individuals tend to be victims of bullying, harassment, and family rejection. Bullying and harassment in school on the basis of sexual orientation has been linked to negative mental health (increased depression and lower self-esteem) and education-related outcomes (increased school absences and lower performance). Family rejection has also been linked to poorer mental health outcomes, including increases in depression and suicidal attempts, and negative health behaviors, such as substance use and risky sex behavior. Some researchers also argue that the higher prevalence of clinical mental disorders in the LGBTQ population can be understood as a consequence of the discrimination experienced in their daily environments and interactions.

LGBTQ people of color tend to be targets of both racism and heterosexism, which independently predicts depression, but associations between discrimination and suicidal ideation has only been found in relation to heterosexism. This population report experiencing discrimination during job searches and interactions with the police.

Societal rejection of the LGBTQ community also tend to manifest in the form of internalized homophobia, which arises in LGBTQ individuals as a result of socialization into the belief that homosexuality is immoral and wrong. Multiple meta-analyses find that internalized homophobia is associated with demoralization, guilt, suicidal ideation and attempts, sexual identity development, self-esteem, depression, psychological distress, physical health, adherence to traditional gender roles, issues with sexual intimacy, and difficulties coming out. Although stigma and discrimination also show association with the aforementioned psychological and psychosocial issues, internalized homophobia has been found to be the most reliable predictor of mental and physical health issues in LGBTQ communities.

Research on the impact of sexual assault on health in women populations find that targets of sexual harassment experience a range of mental health outcomes– including depression, anxiety, fear, guilt, shame, anger, and PTSD–  and physical health problems such as headaches, digestive system issues, and sleep disorders. Research relating assault to health in women populations offers a glimpse as to the potential impact of assault on sexual minorities, who are more likely to be victims of physical and sexual assault relative to non-sexual minorities.

Elderly population 
Discrimination against the elderly population has been document in healthcare and employment settings, where elderly individuals tend to devalued and the targets of ageist stereotypes. For example, doctors tend to prescribe milder treatments for elderly individuals whom they are likely to perceive as physically and psychologically frail. Elderly populations in the UK also experience discrimination in the form of neglect and financial exploitation. A meta-analysis of U.S.- and UK-based studies on the impact of ageism found associations with poorer mental health, well-being, physical and cognitive functioning, and survival chances. Research also finds that exposure to ageist stereotypes reduces memory performance, self-efficacy, and willingness to live and increases cardiovascular reactivity.

Coping mechanisms 
Research identifies a few potential moderators of the impact of discrimination on health such as strength of ethnic identity, social network, and coping strategies.

Social network 
Research shows that having a social network to rely on during difficult times could translate to increased accessibility to resources such as health care, medicine, and high-nutrient food. The benefits of having a social network is exemplified through research showing that having conversations about discrimination experiences with closed ones is associated with decreased likelihood of risky sex behavior in gay Latino men. Seeking social support following discrimination experiences has also been associated with lower levels of depressions. However, a meta-analysis of 15 studies on the potential for social support to reduce the influence of discrimination on mental health, physical health, and detrimental health behaviors reveals that social support does not necessarily moderate the relationship between discrimination and health.

Racial/ethnic identity 
Social identity theory suggests that individuals are social beings who derive benefits from group identification and belonging, which could act as a buffer against the discrimination. Evidence of the potential for racial/ethnic identification to moderate the relationship between discrimination and health comes from research on large samples of Latino and Filipino American samples, in which it was found that the relationship between discrimination and mental health was weaker for individuals higher in racial/ethnic identification.

On the other hand, self-categorization theory indicates that higher levels of identification may lead to increased awareness and anticipation of discrimination, which consequently elicit negative emotions. Research in support of this relationship was found in samples of Asian American college students who report lower levels of positive emotions after being asked to imagine an incident of racial discrimination. A meta-analysis of 51 studies and a review of the literature investigating the potential moderating effect of racial/ethnic identity reveals that the association between discrimination and physical health is weaker in individuals who are committed to their racial/ethnic identity. They also find that, in individuals who are still exploring their racial/ethnic identity, associations between discrimination and poorer mental health and risky health behaviors was stronger.

Coping strategies 
Responses to discrimination can vary from anger suppression, avoidance, and confrontation to advocacy, seeking social support, and making changes to the self. Research sorts coping strategies into two categories: problem-focused coping, which are strategies that take a direct approach to tackling the experience of discrimination (e.g. cognitive reframing or support seeking), and emotion-focused coping, which are strategies that seek to reduce psychological distress experienced from discrimination (e.g. avoidance or distraction). The literature on coping strategies indicates that individuals usually use a combination of both problem-focused and emotion-focused strategies, but that problem-focused coping tends to be more effective and adaptive.

Studies exploring the moderating effects of problem- and emotion-focused coping strategies on the relationship between discrimination and health finds mixed evidence. Research on samples of Mexican adolescents and Asian international students indicate that problem-focused coping weakens the relationship between discrimination and self-esteem while emotion-focused coping strengthens the association between discrimination and depression. Similarly, research on Black Americans finds emotion-focused coping, in the form of anger suppression, to be associated with elevated blood pressure levels in Black Americans. However, research on samples of African American college students, Mexican adolescents, and Southeast Asians finds the reverse association: emotion-focused coping was found to weaken the negative impact of discrimination on self-esteem and life-satisfaction in African Americans, on mental health and health-behaviors in Mexican youths, and on depression in Southeast Asians.

Coping strategies can also be adaptive (e.g. positive reframing, acceptance, planning) or maladaptive (e.g. denial, self-blame, distraction). In a population of college students, research finds that adaptive coping is associated with decreased tendency to overeat in response to discrimination experiences while maladaptive coping is associated with an increased tendency to overeat. Research also finds evidence of the benefits of adaptive coping strategies in a sample of Black female college students in which they found active coping to be associated with lower systolic and diastolic blood pressure. A meta-analysis of 9 studies investigating the relationship between coping strategies and health suggests that problem-focused and adaptive coping strategies are more likely to buffer the impact of discrimination on health than emotion-focused and maladaptive strategies.

References 

Psychology articles needing attention
Discrimination
Sociology
Health